The Škoda 637 is a Czechoslovak mid-size car that was made by Škoda from 1932 to 1935.

The car has a 1,961 cc, six-cylinder, sidevalve engine, which is an enlarged version of the 1,792 cc engine introduced in the successful Škoda 633 in 1931. Transmission is via a single-plate clutch and four-speed gearbox with synchronised third and fourth gears.

The wheels are pressed steel, with drum brakes. The car has 12 Volt electrics. The body has pressed steel panels on an ash frame.

Type 637
The original 1932 version of the Type 637 was built on a ladder frame. Its 1,961 cc engine produces .

In 1933 a trio of Type 637 cars won second, third and fourth place in the two-litre class of the Czechoslovak 1,000 miles race. In 1934 a Type 637 again won second place.

But economic conditions were poor in the early 1930s, and Škoda managed to sell very few Type 637 cars. Only 11 were built.

Types 637D and 637K
Škoda developed a new backbone chassis based on the successful Tatra concept. This had more torsional stiffness than a ladder frame. The first Škoda to have a backbone chassis was the 420 Standard introduced in 1933. In 1934 Škoda applied a larger version of the same chassis to the Type 637.

The improved model was designated Type 637D. Body options offered included a two-door or four-door sedan and a six-seat, "six-light" limousine with sunroof. Sales improved slightly, with 39 cars being built.

Škoda revised the model again as the 637K. Sales remained low, with only 17 examples of this version being built. Production ceased in 1935.

Successors

A Type 637 with its engine enlarged to 2,492 cc and its chassis lengthened became the prototype Škoda Type 640. The model was launched on 22 October 1934 as the Škoda Superb.

In 1936 Škoda tried to return to the Type 637's segment of the mid-range market with the four-cylinder Škoda Favorit. This model also suffered from poor sales, and production ceased in 1941.

References

Source

Cars introduced in 1932
Cars of the Czech Republic
637